St. Joseph's Cathedral is the name of numerous cathedral churches that are named for Saint Joseph.

Africa

Tanzania 
 Saint Joseph's Cathedral, Dar es Salaam
 St. Joseph's Cathedral, Zanzibar

Asia

Bangladesh 
St Joseph's Cathedral, Khulna

China 
 Wangfujing Cathedral or St. Joseph's Cathedral, Beijing
 St. Joseph's Cathedral of Chongqing
 St. Joseph's Cathedral of Guiyang
 St. Joseph's Cathedral of Hankou
 St. Joseph's Cathedral of Shantou
 St. Joseph's Cathedral of Tianjin
 St. Joseph's Cathedral of Wuhu

India 
 An alternate name for St. Philomena's Cathedral, Mysore
 St. Joseph's Cathedral, Allahabad
 St Joseph's Cathedral, Gorakhpur
 St Joseph's Cathedral, Hyderabad
 St Joseph's Cathedral, Lucknow
 St Joseph's Cathedral, Muvattupuzha
 St Joseph's Pro-Cathedral, Patna
 St. Joseph's Cathedral, Trivandrum
 St Joseph's Cathedral, Vasai
 St Joseph's Cathedral, Kotdwar
 St Joseph's Cathedral, Meerut
 St Joseph's Cathedral, Chikmagalur
 St. Joseph the Worker Cathedral, Raiganj
 St. Joseph the Worker Cathedral, Sambalpur
 St. Joseph's Cathedral, Guwahati
 Cathedral of St. Joseph, Itanagar
 St. Joseph's Cathedral, Imphal
 Cathedral of St. Joseph, Chingleput
 St. Joseph's Cathedral, Raipur
 St. Joseph's Cathedral, Jagdalpur
 St. Joseph's Cathedral, Jamshedpur
 St. Joseph's Cathedral, Nellore
 St. Joseph's Cathedral, Paliserry
 St Joseph's Cathedral, Mananthavady
 St. Joseph's Cathedral, Dindigul
 St. Joseph's Co-cathedral, Khammam

Indonesia 
Cathedral of St. Joseph, Pontianak

Iraq 
 Cathedral of Saint Joseph, Ankawa
 Latin Cathedral of St. Joseph

Kazakhstan 
Cathedral of St. Joseph, Karaganda

Malaysia 
St. Joseph Cathedral, Kuching
St. Joseph Cathedral, Miri

Pakistan
St. Joseph's Cathedral, Rawalpindi

Philippines 
Cathedral of St. Joseph the Patriarch, Alaminos City
Balanga Cathedral or St. Joseph Cathedral, Balanga City
Cathedral of St. Joseph the Worker, Ipil
Cathedral of St. Joseph, Romblon
Cathedral of St. Joseph the Worker, San Jose, Antique
St. Joseph Cathedral, San Jose, Nueva Ecija
Cathedral of St. Joseph the Worker, San Jose, Occidental Mindoro
Cathedral of St. Joseph the Worker, Tagbilaran

Sri Lanka 
 St. Joseph's Cathedral of Anuradhapura

Vietnam 
Saint Joseph Cathedral (Hanoi)

Europe

Bulgaria 
 Cathedral of St Joseph, Sofia

Latvia 
 St. Joseph Cathedral, Liepāja

Netherlands 
 St. Joseph Cathedral, Groningen

Romania 
 Cathedral of St. Joseph, Bucharest

United Kingdom 
 St Joseph's Cathedral, Swansea, Wales

North America

Canada 
 St. Joseph's Basilica, Edmonton (St. Joseph's Cathedral Basilica), Alberta
 St. Joseph Cathedral (Gatineau), Quebec
 Saint-Joseph Cathedral, Rouyn-Noranda, Quebec

United States 
 St. Joseph Cathedral (Buffalo, New York)
 St. Joseph Cathedral (San Diego, California)
 Cathedral Basilica of St. Joseph (San Jose), California
 Cathedral of St. Joseph (Hartford, Connecticut)
 Basilica of St. Joseph Proto-Cathedral, Bardstown, Kentucky, listed on the National Register of Historic Places as "St. Joseph Cathedral and College Complex"
 St. Joseph Cathedral (Baton Rouge, Louisiana), listed on the NRHP in Louisiana
 St. Joseph Co-Cathedral (Thibodaux, Louisiana), listed on the NRHP in Louisiana
 Cathedral of Saint Joseph (Jefferson City, Missouri)
 Cathedral of St. Joseph (St. Joseph, Missouri)
 Cathedral of St. Joseph (Manchester, New Hampshire)
 St. Joseph Cathedral (Bayonne, New Jersey)
 St. Joseph Pro-Cathedral (Camden, New Jersey)
 Co-Cathedral of St. Joseph (Brooklyn), New York
 St. Joseph Cathedral (Columbus, Ohio)
 St. Joseph Old Cathedral (Oklahoma City), listed on the NRHP in Oklahoma
 St. Joseph Cathedral (Sioux Falls, South Dakota)
 Cathedral of Saint Joseph (Burlington, Vermont)
 Cathedral of Saint Joseph (Wheeling, West Virginia)
 Cathedral of Saint Joseph the Workman, La Crosse, Wisconsin

Oceania

American Samoa 
 Co-Cathedral of St. Joseph the Worker (Fagatogo, American Samoa)

Australia 
 St Josephs Cathedral, Rockhampton, Queensland

New Zealand 
 St. Joseph's Cathedral, Dunedin

South America

Argentina 
 St. Joseph's Cathedral, Gualeguaychú

Brazil 
 St. Joseph's Cathedral, Fortaleza

Colombia 
 St. Joseph's Cathedral, Cúcuta

See also 
 List of churches named after Saint Joseph

St Joseph
churches named after Saint Joseph
Saint Joseph (husband of Mary)